Kerry Ray King (born June 3, 1964) is an American musician, best known for being the co-lead guitarist and songwriter of thrash metal band Slayer. He co-founded the band with Jeff Hanneman in 1981 and remained a member for nearly four decades.

Biography

Early life
The youngest of three children, King was born and raised in Los Angeles, California. His father was an aircraft parts inspector, and his mother worked for a telephone company. He started learning guitar at the age of thirteen at his father's urging, saying "...my dad was trying to get me out of the wrong circles and give me a hobby." King attended three different high schools and had very good grades, even winning an award as his school's top math student in junior high. As the youngest child in the family, King says he was "spoilt" growing up. He learned guitar on his father's Gibson ES-175 and later had a Fender Stratocaster which he traded for a BC Rich Mockingbird, beginning a long relationship with BC Rich guitars. The first song he ever learned was Ted Nugent's "Cat Scratch Fever" and he soon became a major fan of Van Halen and Judas Priest, which had a major impact on his guitar playing.

Slayer
King formed his first band with another guitarist who had been teaching him lessons, and this guitarist introduced him to Tom Araya. He discovered that he and Araya lived only a block away from each other, and they agreed to start jamming together. "Everything began from that point", King has said of Slayer's origins. In 1981, King was at an audition for a southern rock band which Jeff Hanneman was also auditioning for. King heard Hanneman playing guitar near the reception desk and approached him, soon learning that they liked a lot of the same music, and they decided to jam together. The pair enjoyed playing together and decided to start their own band with Araya and a neighborhood drummer named Dave Lombardo, which would soon evolve into Slayer. King, along with Araya, remained in Slayer for the entire length of the band's career, from 1981 to 2019.

In 1984, King was invited by ex-Metallica guitarist Dave Mustaine to join his new band Megadeth. Slayer's future was briefly in doubt as King played several shows with Megadeth, though he ultimately did not join full-time due to his commitment to Slayer. He still lived with his parents and has said that the desire to not spend time at home with his family caused him to spend more time rehearsing with the band, which helped his musicianship improve tremendously.

King says at that time their music was viewed simply as heavy metal and the term "thrash" emerged later. He was becoming heavily influenced by the band Venom, which helped shape Slayer's dark image. King says that after releasing Haunting The Chapel and Hell Awaits and seeing the band's audience grow steadily, he knew Slayer would be his career. The controversy surrounding Slayer's 1986 song "Angel Of Death" fueled King to dedicate himself to songwriting. "I think, on the whole, that mankind is full of fucking idiots. In a nutshell, our lyrics just say 'think'. That's it", he said of the unwanted "Angel of Death" attention.

Slayer fared better than most bands after heavy metal's dramatic decline in the 1990s, which King describes as "the fuckin' Limp Bizkit era". King almost stopped writing music entirely due to how offensive he believed the music scene had become at that time. "I couldn't understand why anybody would make music like that, let alone like it. That was definitely my darkest time as a musician, and that definitely showed up on Diabolus in Musica... through my lack of involvement", he has said.

Guest appearances

In addition to appearing on Slayer's albums, he has also made several guest appearances for other artists. While lending production to 1986's Reign in Blood, Rick Rubin was also helping with the production of the Beastie Boys' debut album Licensed to Ill. Rubin felt the track "No Sleep till Brooklyn" needed a guitar solo, so he called in King to lay down the part. King has since commented that his playing ability "certainly wasn't that of a virtuoso". The video for "No Sleep till Brooklyn", whose title was a spoof on Motörhead's 1981 live album No Sleep 'til Hammersmith, was originally intended to feature King being knocked offstage by a gorilla, although King refused. King replied, "If there's gonna be anyone knocking anyone offstage, it'll be me knocking the gorilla", which was what subsequently happened.

On Licensed to Ill, King also played the guitar solo on the song "Fight For Your Right (To Party)".

King contributed the main lead guitar solo and outro part to Pantera's song "Goddamn Electric", which appeared on the 2000 album, Reinventing the Steel. King's rig was set up in Pantera's bathroom backstage just after Ozzfest in Dallas, as the group still did not have their own dressing room, on top of not appearing on the festival bill.  King has also made several guest appearances on Marilyn Manson's Rape of the World Tour, joining the band to play tracks such as "Little Horn", "1996" and "Irresponsible Hate Anthem". Many fans noticed elements of King's own style used on these occasions. On October 21, 2010, the final date of the Jägermeister Music Tour, King joined Megadeth on stage at the Gibson Amphitheater in Hollywood to perform "Rattlehead" which was the first time in 26 years that King had shared the stage with Megadeth (King had been a touring substitute for a few months in 1984).

He made an appearance in the 2009 movie Brooklyn's Finest as a member of SWAT team led by Ethan Hawke's character. In 2022, he appeared in the movie Studio 666 as Krug.

Style and influence

King's first experience with a guitar was when he was a child. Steve Huey of AllMusic has commented in his review for Reign in Blood that Kerry King and Jeff Hanneman's demented soloing often mimics the screams of the songs' victims. He also described his and Jeff Hanneman's guitar solos as "wildly chaotic". Thom Jurek, also of AllMusic, described his work on 2006's Christ Illusion as creating "an intensely harrowing and angular riff that changes from verse to verse, through the refrain and bridge, and comes back again."

King listed Venom, Judas Priest, Iron Maiden, Mercyful Fate, Deep Purple and Black Sabbath as his favorite bands during his teen years. He said once "Anybody who plays heavy music and doesn't cite Sabbath as an influence is lying, because that's where it all started." He cited Glenn Tipton and K. K. Downing of Judas Priest as his biggest influences as a guitarist that inspire his style, tone, and gear. He mentioned Eddie Van Halen, Ted Nugent, Ronnie Montrose, Tony Iommi, Ritchie Blackmore, Michael Schenker, Dave Murray, Adrian Smith and Randy Rhoads as other influences.

Personal life
King has been twice divorced and has a daughter named Shyanne Kymberlee King with his first wife; his current wife is Ayesha King. He claims he has never done drugs, though he has said "I'm quite an experienced drinker".

Prior to 2020, King had lived in California for almost all of his life. He relocated to Phoenix, Arizona around 1987, and while living there, he was a neighbor of Judas Priest singer Rob Halford. By the early 2000s, King had moved back to Los Angeles, and he would later relocate to Riverside County, California. In April 2020, King and Ayesha bought one home in Las Vegas, Nevada; as of November 2021, however, the couple resides in New York City.

King is an antitheist. He is known to oppose and strongly criticise organized religion by expressing his views in his songwriting. In a 2006 interview with Blabbermouth.net, King expressed his anti-religious views: "I don't really have a life philosophy; my thing is just rebelling against pretty much organized religion. That is my main thing, because personally I think it's a crutch for people that are too weak to get through life on their own. I'm the kind of guy that says if I don't see it, then it doesn't work. And nobody can show me God." When asked by Revolver Magazine what superpower would he want if he was a supervillain, King replied "the ability to burst a church into flames by simply walking by it."

King is an avid snake collector who owns a reptile house and herpetology nursery called Psychotic Exotics.

King has stayed clear of politics, but stated in 2017 that he was "embarrassed about Trump's presidency," which he described as "divisive and polarizing."

King's body has grown increasingly tattooed over his career, with Blender Magazine once producing a tour of his body ink. King's abbreviation, KFK, was revealed to mean "Kerry Fuckin' King" in the January 2007 Issue of Guitar World.

Equipment

Discography

Slayer

Other artists

References

External links

 King's 2002 Slayer Guitar Rig. GuitarGeek.com
 "Slayer's Kerry King - Wikipedia: Fact or Fiction? (Part 1)," Loudwire, April 22, 2015. —video.
 "Slayer's Kerry King - Wikipedia: Fact or Fiction? (Part 2)," Loudwire, April 29, 2015. —video.
 Psychotic Exotics Facebook page
NAMM Oral History Interview January 25, 2013 

1964 births
American atheists
American heavy metal guitarists
American male guitarists
Critics of religions
Guitarists from Los Angeles
Lead guitarists
Living people
Slayer members
20th-century American guitarists
21st-century American guitarists